Archives and Artifacts (2005) is a box set by the American thrash metal band Death Angel, consisting of remasters of their first two albums The Ultra-Violence and Frolic through the Park, as well as a bonus CD, and a DVD with video recordings of the band and a music video.  There was an error in the first pressing of the box set.  The bonus tracks meant for Frolic through the Park ended up on The Ultra-Violence disc, while three tunes from the third disc (the "Rarities" disc) ended up as bonus tracks on Frolic through the Park instead.  The songs from the  "Kill as One" demo tape, which were meant to be a bonus on The Ultra-Violence, were excluded altogether.  This error was corrected on the second pressing by Rykodisc.

Track listing

DVD 

"Death Angel Intro"
"Original Electronic Press Kit"
"International TV Interview"
"Guilty of Innocence (multimedia track)" (Cavestany, Galeon, Osegueda, Pepa, Pepa)
"Bored (multimedia track)" (Cavestany, Osegueda)
"Voracious Souls (Music Video)" (Cavestany, Galeon, Osegueda)

Personnel 
Mark Osegueda – vocals
Rob Cavestany – guitars
Gus Pepa – guitars
Dennis Pepa – bass
Andy Galeon – drums

References 

Death Angel albums
2005 compilation albums
2005 video albums
Rykodisc compilation albums
Rykodisc live albums
Thrash metal compilation albums